Lunfardo (from the Italian lombardo or inhabitant of Lombardy in the local dialect) is an argot originated and developed in the late 19th and early 20th centuries in the lower classes in Buenos Aires and from there spread to other urban areas nearby, such as the Greater Buenos Aires, Rosario and Montevideo.

Originally, Lunfardo was a slang used by criminals and soon by other people of the lower and lower-middle classes. Later, many of its words and phrases were introduced in the vernacular and disseminated in the Spanish of Argentina, and Uruguay. Nevertheless, since the early 20th century, Lunfardo has spread among all social strata and classes by habitual use or because it was common in the lyrics of tango.

Today, the meaning of the term lunfardo has been extended to designate any slang or jargon used in Buenos Aires.

Origin
Lunfardo (or lunfa for short) began as prison slang in the late 19th century so guards would not understand prisoners. According to Oscar Conde, the word came from "lumbardo" (the inhabitants of the region Lombardia in Italy, the origin of most of the Italians in Argentina in the early 20th century).  However, the vernacular Spanish of mid-19th century Buenos Aires as preserved in the dialogue of Esteban Echeverría's short story The Slaughter Yard (El matadero) is already a prototype of Lunfardo.

Etymology

Most sources believe that Lunfardo originated among criminals, and later became more commonly used by other classes. Circa 1870, the word lunfardo itself (originally a deformation of lombardo in several Italian dialects) was often used to mean "outlaw".

Lunfardo today
Today, many Lunfardo terms have entered the language spoken all over Argentina and Uruguay, although a great number of Lunfardo words have fallen into disuse or have been modified in the era of suburbanization. Furthermore, the term "Lunfardo" has become synonymous with "speech of Buenos Aires" or "Porteño", mainly of the inhabitants of the City of Buenos Aires, as well as its surrounding areas, Greater Buenos Aires. The Montevideo speech has almost as much "Lunfardo slang" as the Buenos Aires speech. Conde says that Lunfardo (much like Cocoliche) can be considered a kind of Italian dialect mixed with Spanish words, specifically the one spoken in Montevideo. In other words, Lunfardo is an interlanguage variety of the Italian dialects spoken by immigrants in the areas of Buenos Aires and Montevideo.

In Argentina, any neologism that reached a minimum level of acceptance is considered, by default, a Lunfardo term. The original slang has been immortalized in numerous tango lyrics.

Conde takes the view that the Lunfardo is not so much a dialect but a kind of local language of the Italian immigrants, mixed with Spanish and some French words. He believes that Lunfardo is not a criminal slang, since most Lunfardo words are not related to crime.

According to Conde, Lunfardo

Characteristics

Lunfardo words are inserted in the normal flow of Rioplatense Spanish sentences, but grammar and pronunciation do not change. Thus, an average Spanish-speaking person reading tango lyrics will need, at most, the translation of a discrete set of words.

Tango lyrics use Lunfardo sparsely, but some songs (such as El Ciruja –Lunfardo for "The Hobo" or "The Bum"– or most lyrics by Celedonio Flores) employ Lunfardo heavily. Milonga Lunfarda by Edmundo Rivero is an instructive and entertaining primer on Lunfardo usage.

A characteristic of Lunfardo is its use of word play, notably vesre (from "[al] revés"), reversing the syllables, similar to English back slang, French verlan, Croatian Šatrovački or Greek podaná. Thus, tango becomes gotán and café (coffee) becomes feca.

Lunfardo employs metaphors such as bobo ("dumb") for the heart, who "works all day long without being paid" or bufoso ("snorter") for pistol.

Finally, there are words that are derived from others in Spanish, such as the verb abarajar, which means to stop a situation or a person (such as to stop your opponent's blows with the blade of your knife) and is related to the verb "barajar", which means to cut or shuffle a deck of cards.

Examples

Nouns
 buchón – "snitch", informer to the law (from the Spanish buche, in turn slang for "mouth")
 chochamu – "young man" (vesre for muchacho)
facha - "face", and by extension "appearance", "looks" (from Italian faccia, "face")
fato - "affair", "business" (from the Italian fatto, lit. "done")
 fiaca – "laziness", or lazy person (from the Italian fiacca, "laziness, sluggishness")
gamba - "leg" (from the Italian gamba "leg"). Also "100 pesos".
gomías – "friends" (vesre for amigos)
 guita – "money", "dole"
 lorca – "heat", as in hot weather (vesre for calor, "heat")
 luca – "1,000 pesos"
 mango – "peso"
 mina – "chick", "broad" (from the Italian femmina, "female")
naso - "nose" (from the Italian naso, "nose")
 palo – "1,000,000 pesos"
 palo/s verde/s - "dollars"
 percanta – a young woman
 pibe – "kid", a common term for boy or, in more recent times, for young man. It comes from Italian word "pivello".
 quilombo – "racket", "ruckus", "mess"; also slang for "brothel" (from the Kimbundu word kilombo, a Maroon settlement).
urso – a heavyset guy. It comes from the  Italian "orso" (bear).
 yorugua – "Uruguayan", (vesre for uruguayo) .

Verbs
 cerebrar – "to think something up" (from cerebro, "brain")
 engrupir – "to fool someone" (maybe from Italian ingroppare, "to fuck", but also used in modern European and Brazilian Portuguese slang)
 garpar – "to pay with money" (vesre for pagar, "to pay")
 junar – "to look closely", "to check out"/ "to know" (from Caló junar, "to hear")
 laburar – "to work" (from Italian lavorare, "to work")
 manyar – "to eat"/ "to know" (from Venetian and Lombard magnar - Italian mangiare)
 morfar – "to eat" (from French argot morfer, "to eat")
 pescar – "to understand", "to get a grip" (vesre from the Italian capisce?, "Do you understand?") associated to the Spanish verb pescar ("to fish")

Interjections

 che - appellative to introduce a conversational intervention or to call out, translatable as "hey!", "listen to me!", "so", "as I was telling you!" and other ways of addressing someone. The expression identifies Argentinians to other Spanish speakers, thus Ernesto "Che" Guevara for the Cubans (Guaraní, Venetian and Valencian origins have been propounded).
 ¡guarda! - "look out!", "be careful!" (from the Italian guarda!, "look!")

Modern slang

Since the 1970s, it is a matter of debate whether newer additions to the slang of Buenos Aires qualify as lunfardo.  Traditionalists argue that lunfardo must have a link to the argot of the old underworld, to tango lyrics, or to racetrack slang. Others maintain that the colloquial language of Buenos Aires is lunfardo by definition.

Some examples of modern talk:

 gomas (lit. "tires") – "tits", woman's breasts
 maza (lit. "mace" or "sledgehammer") – "superb"
 curtir (lit. "to tan leather") – "to dig", "to be knowledgeable about", "to be involved in". Also "to fuck".
curtir fierros can mean both "to be into car mechanics" or "to be into firearms". Fierro is the Old Spanish form of hierro ("iron"). In Argentine parlance, fierro can mean a firearm or anything related to metals and mechanics (for example a racing car)
 zafar – "to scrape out of", "to get off the hook", "to barely get by", etc. Zafar is a standard Spanish verb (originally meaning "to extricate oneself") that had fallen out of use and was restored to everyday Buenos Aires speech in the 1970s by students, with the meaning of "barely passing (an examination)".
 trucho – "counterfeit", "fake"; trucho is from old Spanish slang truchamán, which in turn derives from the Arabic turjeman ("translator", referring specifically to a person who accosts foreigners and lures them into tourist traps). Folk etymology derives this word from trucha ("trout"), or from the Italian trucco - something made fake on purpose. 

Many new terms had spread from specific areas of the dynamic Buenos Aires cultural scene: invented by screenwriters, used around the arts-and-crafts fair in Plaza Francia, culled from the vocabulary of psychoanalysis.

Influence from Cocoliche
Lunfardo was influenced by Cocoliche, a pidgin of Italian immigrants.  Many Cocoliche words were transferred to Lunfardo in the first half of the 20th century. For example:

 lonyipietro - "fool"
 fungi - "mushroom"  → in Lunfardo: "hat"
 vento - "wind" → in Lunfardo: "money"
 matina - "morning" (from Italian mattina)
 mina - "girl" (from Lombard mina)
 laburar - "to work" (from Italian lavorare and Spanish laborar)
 minga - "nothing!" (from Lombard minga, negative particle like not in English or ne pas in French)
 yeta - "bad luck" (from Neapolitan iettatore)
 yira/yira - "to walk around (generally in circles)", "to ramble aimlessly", etc. (from Italian girare, "to turn", "to tour"). Usually "yiro" or "yira" is used to refer to a prostitute.
 ¡salute! - "cheers!" (from Italian salute!)
 eccole - "exactly" (from Italian eccole)

Some Italian linguists, because of the Cocoliche influences, argue that the Lunfardo can be considered a pidgin of the Italian language.

Suffixes

A rarer feature of Porteño speech that can make it completely unintelligible is the random addition of suffixes with no particular meaning, usually making common words sound reminiscent of Italian surnames, for no particular reason, but playful language. These endings include -etti, -elli eli, -oni, -eni, -anga, -ango, -enga, -engue, -engo, -ingui, -ongo, -usi, -ula, -usa, -eta, among others. Examples: milanesa (meat dish)  milanga, cuaderno ("notebook")  cuadernelli, etc.

See also

Cocoliche
Germanía
Vesre
Jeringonza
 Argot
Viveza criolla

Notes

Bibliography
 Conde, Oscar. Lunfardo: Un estudio sobre el habla popular de los argentinos.Ediciones Taurus. Buenos Aires, 2011

External links
 (English) "Lunfardo: The Slang of Buenos Aires"
 (English) "Porteño Spanish – Learn Argentine Slang"
 (English) "A Survivors Guide To Buenos Aires"
 (English)  "CheViste – Lunfardo Dictionary"
 Diccionario del lunfardo
 Defining Lunfardo
 Lunfardo's history
 Academia Porteña del Lunfardo

Buenos Aires
Italian-Argentine culture
Italian-Uruguayan culture
Italian language in the Americas
Tango
Languages of Argentina
Languages of Uruguay
Cant languages
Spanish slang
City colloquials